Les Coteaux, also known as the ZUP de Dornach, is a cité HLM (council estate) in the west of the city of Mulhouse, Alsace, France.

See also
 HLM
 Public housing in France

Mulhouse